Canoas Sport Club, usually known as Canoas is a Brazilian football club from Canoas, Rio Grande do Sul, founded by the Lutheran University of Brazil (in Portuguese, Universidade Luterana do Brasil - ULBRA). The club is also active in futsal. The club was originally named Sport Club Ulbra and then Universidade Sport Club.

History
On January 26, 1998, the club was founded by the Lutheran University of Brazil as Sport Club Ulbra. The club started with volleyball, futsal, handball, and athletics sections.

In 2001, the club started its football department, and joined the Rio Grande do Sul Football Federation.

In 2002, Ulbra competed in the Campeonato Gaúcho Third Division and the Second Division, because the competition's regulation allowed a club to play in both divisions in the same year. The club also participated in the national third division, the Campeonato Brasileiro Série C for the first time. The club was eliminated in the quarterfinals by Marília.

In 2003, the club won the Campeonato Gaúcho Second Division, and was promoted to the First Division for the following season. The club again competed in the Campeonato Brasileiro Série C. Ulbra was eliminated in the second stage by another club from the same state, RS.

In 2004, Ulbra was the Campeonato Gaúcho's runner-up. The club beat Grêmio 3-1 in the semifinals, but was defeated by Internacional in the final. The club competed again in the Campeonato Brasileiro Série C and was eliminated by Hermann Aichinger in the second stage.

In 2005, the club entered the national cup competition, the Copa do Brasil, for the first time. Ulbra was eliminated in the first round by Treze. In 2006 the club competed in the Campeonato Brasileiro Série C, but was eliminated in the second stage of the competition, and in 2007, the club was eliminated in the third stage of the championship.

The club was renamed to Universidade Sport Club in December 2009. The club was renamed to Canoas Sport Club on November 26, 2010.

Football

Stadium

The club's home matches are usually played at Complexo Esportivo da Ulbra stadium, which has a maximum capacity of 5,000 people.

Titles

 Campeonato Gaúcho Second Division: 2003
 Campeonato Gaúcho runner-up: 2004
 Copa FGF runner-up: 2005, 2006
 Copa Emídio 'Burbão' Perondi runner-up: 2006

Current squad

Futsal

Titles

 Intercontinental Futsal Cup: 1999, 2001
 Liga Futsal: 1998, 2002, 2003

Current squad

Colors
The club's colors are blue, white and red.

Other sports
Besides football and futsal, Canoas also has other sports sections, such as volleyball, judo, basketball, tennis, athletics and trampolining.

References

External links
Official Website

 
Association football clubs established in 1998
Futsal clubs established in 1998
Football clubs in Rio Grande do Sul
Futsal clubs in Brazil
University and college association football clubs
1998 establishments in Brazil